Habana won its second Cuban National Series, with a comfortable five-game cushion over Constructores.

Standings

References

 (Note - text is printed in a white font on a white background, depending on browser used.)

Cuban National Series seasons
Base
Base
1974 in baseball